Ivan Stanić (born May 28, 1983) is a Croatian cruiserweight Muay Thai kickboxer, former W.B.C. Muaythai world champion and King of the Ring muay thai world champion.

Personal life
Stanić has finished Faculty of Tourism and Hospitality Management in Opatija. He is also student of University of Zagreb Faculty of Kinesiology for specialist graduate professional study. He is employed by Generali Group as a Risk manager and also works as a fitness trainer for professional athletes and recreational athletes.

Career
During Opatija Fight Night 2, Stanić fought the incumbent WBC Muaythai World cruiserweight champion Frédérique Bellonie for his title. He defeated Bellonie by a majority decision.

He replaced injured Cheick Sidibe in a match against tadej Toplak at Enfusion 3: Trial of the Gladiators on December 2, 2012 in Ljubljana, Slovenia. Stanić accepted the fight although he had only 10 days to prepare and to lose 9 kilograms, because of that he ended in hospital and in order to do the fight he arranged the fight in 88 kilogram limit. At the end he lost the fight after three even rounds by judges decision.

In May 2015, Stanić fought Bogdan Stoica for the vacant SUPERKOMBAT Cruiserweight Championship. Stoica won the fight by unanimous decision.
 
In September 2015, Stanić fought Jiri Zak for the vacant ISKA World Cruiserweight title. Stanić lost the fight by a third round TKO.

Following this loss, Stanić won his next three fights, winning decision against Ricu Beleniuc, Samuele Canonico and Danilo Tošić.

Stanić fought once during 2017, when he met Denis Chorchyp at W5 Legends Collide. He won the fight by unanimous decision.

His last fight of 2018 came during Opatija Fight Night X, when he was scheduled to fight Damjan Savanović. Stanič defeated Savanović by unanimous decision.

Titles and achievements
Professional:
 2011 KOTR World Cruiserweight Champion (-90 kg)
 2010 WBC Muaythai World Champion (-86.363 kg)
Amateur:
 2016 Croatian Senior Kickboxing Championships  -91 kg (Low kick Rules)
 2016 Croatian Senior Kickboxing Championships  -94 kg (Kick Light Rules)
 2008 Croatian Senior Kickboxing Championships  -86 kg (K-1 Rules)
 2007 W.A.K.O. World Championships   -86 kg (K-1)
 2007 Croatian Senior Kickboxing Championships  -91 kg (Low kick Rules)
 2006 W.A.K.O. European Championships Low-Kick  (-91 kg) (Low-Kick)
 2005 Croatian Senior Kickboxing Championships  -91 kg (Low kick Rules)

Kickboxing record

See also
List of WAKO Amateur World Championships
List of WAKO Amateur European Championships
List of male kickboxers

References

External links
Official site of Opatija Fight Club gym
Profile at 

Living people
1983 births
Croatian male kickboxers
Cruiserweight kickboxers
Heavyweight kickboxers
Croatian Muay Thai practitioners
SUPERKOMBAT kickboxers
Competitors at the 2017 World Games